The Women's Marathon at the 1988 Summer Olympics in Seoul, South Korea was held on Friday September 23, 1988. The race started at 09.30h local time and was won by Rosa Mota of Portugal. There were 70 competitors from 39 countries, with 64 finishers.

Medalists

Abbreviations
All times shown are in hours:minutes:seconds

Records

Final rankings

See also
 1986 Women's European Championships Marathon (Stuttgart)
 1987 Women's World Championships Marathon (Rome)
 1988 Marathon Year Ranking
 1990 Women's European Championships Marathon (Split)
 1991 Women's World Championships Marathon (Tokyo)

References

External links
  Official report
  Marathon info

M
Marathons at the Olympics
1988 marathons
1988 Summer Olympics
Summer Olympics marathon
Women's events at the 1988 Summer Olympics